Ken Sterling Poulsen (August 4, 1947 – December 28, 2017) was a professional baseball utility player  who played briefly for the Boston Red Sox of Major League Baseball (MLB) during the 1967 season.

Biography
Poulsen played three years of varsity baseball at Birmingham High School in Los Angeles, where he helped his team win the championship of the West Valley League in 1963, 1964, and 1965, being named a first-team all-star in the league and third-team all-star on the All-City team. He was selected by the Boston Red Sox in the third round of the 1965 MLB draft, and played in the minor leagues in 1966 for the Winston-Salem Red Sox in the Class A Carolina League, batting .238 in 110 games with 11 home runs and 49 RBIs.

In 1967, Poulsen played 73 games with Winston-Salem, and 19 games for the Double-A Pittsfield Red Sox. He gained a promotion to Boston as a replacement for infielder Dalton Jones.

Poulsen made his major league debut on July 3, 1967, and appeared in five games with the Red Sox. He had one hit (a double) in five at-bats for a .200 average. He also made three fielding appearances; twice at third base and once at shortstop, recording a .667 fielding percentage (one error in three chances). He played his final MLB game on July 14, 1967. The Red Sox would go on to win the American League title, in a season known as "The Impossible Dream".

Following his brief stint in the majors, Poulsen returned to the minor leagues. From 1968 through 1973, he played in the farm system of the New York Yankees, where he experienced some success as a pitcher, posting two seasons with a winning record; 1971 with the Class A Kinston Indians (10–8) and 1972 with the Double-A West Haven Yankees (9–8). Overall as a minor league pitcher, Poulsen had a 33–34 record in 109 games (56 starts) with a 3.02 ERA. As a minor league hitter, he had a .233 average with 37 home runs and 153 RBIs, recorded in 497 games played during eight seasons.

Poulsen died in Fresno, California, on December 28, 2017. In July 2019, the Red Sox recognized Poulsen's contribution, albeit only during five games, to their 1967 pennant-winning season by presenting his family with a commemorative ring in a ceremony at Fenway Park.

References

Further reading

External links

1947 births
2017 deaths
Boston Red Sox players
Winston-Salem Red Sox players
Pittsfield Red Sox players
Binghamton Triplets players
Kinston Eagles players
West Haven Yankees players
Syracuse Chiefs players
Major League Baseball infielders
Baseball players from Los Angeles
People from Van Nuys, Los Angeles
Birmingham High School alumni